Metković ˈmêtkoʋit͜ɕ|hr}}) is a town in the Dubrovnik-Neretva County of Croatia, located in the southeast of the country, on the banks of the river Neretva and on the border with Bosnia and Herzegovina.

Demographics
The total population of the city municipality is 16,788 inhabitants (2011 census), in the following settlements:
 Dubravica, population 90
 Glušci, population 76
Metković, population 15,329
 Prud, population 497
 Vid, population 796

In the census of 2011, 96.8% of the population self-identified as Croats.

History
The city was first mentioned in a 1422 court document as a small farming town. It remained this way until the nineteenth century. During this period the city found renewed investment from the country's Austrian rulers. With the arrival of the area's first post office and school, as well as the increase of trade with the Ottoman Empire, the city began to flourish. It was ruled by Ottoman Empire as part of Sanjak of Herzegovina between 1494 and 1685, then by Republic of Venice till 1797 and finally by French Empire before the Austrian Habsburgs took over. In 1875 and 1910 Emperor Francis Joseph I visited the city.

Metković is located near the ancient Roman settlement of Narona (today Vid). Narona was established as a Roman trading post, after Rome's successful war (Illyrian Wars) with the neighboring Illyrian tribe Daors (ruins of their main city are located near Stolac), and successfully grew until the 3rd century AD. After that it went on a steady decline especially after a large 4th-century AD earthquake. Upon the arrival of Slavonic tribes in the mid-6th century AD, the city of Narona was abandoned with most parts being covered under silt that was carried by the river Neretva. Only minor excavations were done, most of them being concentrated on the location of Vid. One of the city's landmarks is its Church of St. Elijah, the city's patron saint.

Education
Metković has the following education facilities:
 Primary schools:
Stjepan Radić Primary school (Croatian language medium school)
 Don Mihovil Pavlinović Primary school (Croatian language medium school)
 Secondary schools:
 Metković High School
 Metković Gymnasium (classical high school)

For tertiary education students need to move to another city, the most common destinations are: Dubrovnik (business, management, accounting, music), Split (sciences, management, accounting), Zagreb (music, arts, sciences, applied sciences, engineering, architecture, education, humanities, management, accounting, business), Zadar (humanities, education, early childhood education) and Mostar.

Sports (most notably)
NK Neretva
ONK Metković
RK Metković – Mehanika

Notable people

Clergy
Marin Barišić, Metropolitan Archbishop of the Roman Catholic Archdiocese of Split-Makarska
 Josip Marija Carević (1883–1945), bishop of the Roman Catholic Diocese of Dubrovnik

Music
 Milana Vlaović, writer and music producer

Literature, theater, art
 Obrad Gluščević (1913–1980), film director
 Ivan Slamnig (1930–2001), poet
 Vera Zima, actress

Sport
 Andrija Anković (1937–1980), football (soccer) player, gold olympic medallist 1960
 Željko Babić, handball player, Croatian national team player and head-coach, bronze olympic medallist 2012 as assistant coach.
 Ivica Barbarić, football (soccer) player, Yugoslavia national team member at the 1988 Summer Olympics
 Patrik Ćavar, Croatian national team player in handball, gold olympic medallist 1996
 Ivan Čupić, Croatian national team player in handball, bronze olympic medallist 2012
 Davor Dominiković, Croatian national team player in handball, gold olympic medallist 2004
 Slavko Goluža, handball coach, Croatian national team player and head-coach, double gold olympic medallist 1996 and 2004 as player, and bronze olympic medallist 2012 as head coach.
 Sergej Jakirović, Bosnia and Herzegovina national football team player
 Vladimir Jelčić, Croatian national team player in handball, gold olympic medallist 1996, handball coach
 Nikša Kaleb, Croatian national team player in handball, gold olympic medallist 2004
 Juraj Nikolac, chess grandmaster
 Frane Nonković, Yugoslavia men's national water polo team player, silver olympic medallist 1964
 Ivica Obrvan, Croatian national team player in handball, handball coach and head coach
 Ante Pavlović, general secretary of the Croatian Football Federation and Football Association of Yugoslavia, GNK Dinamo Zagreb director
 Bruno Sorić, rower, bronze olympic medallist 1924
 Darijo Srna, Croatia national football team player and captain
 Igor Štimac, Croatia national football team player and head coach, president of the Union of professional clubs in Croatian First Football League
 Mate Trojanović, rower, gold olympic medallist 1952

Other
 Branka Bebić Krstulović, Miss Croatia 1994
 Luka Bebić, President of Croatian Parliament and former Minister of Defence
 Ana Bebić, opera singer; participant in Operacija trijumf
 Miljenko Grgić (aka Mike Grgich), California vintner
 Damir Magaš, first rector of the University of Zadar
 Stanko Marević, National Heroes of Yugoslavia in the Second World War
 Mate Obradović, Minister of Defence Chief inspector
 Božo Petrov, Croatian psychiatrist and politician; Deputy Prime Minister in the cabinet of Prime Minister Tihomir Orešković, former mayor of Metković
 Krešo Rakić, National Heroes of Yugoslavia in the Second World War
 Ante Šprlje, former Minister of Justice
 Nikica Gabrić, ophtamologist, politician and freemasonry leader

See also
Dalmatia

References

External links

  
 Metkovic NEWs

 
Cities and towns in Croatia
Kingdom of Dalmatia
Bosnia and Herzegovina–Croatia border crossings
1422 establishments in Europe
15th-century establishments in Croatia